María Isabel Sánchez is an Argentine radio host and writer, who works in Encendidos En La Tarde with Gerardo "Tato" Young and Rolo Villar and Alguien Tiene Que Decirlo host by Eduardo Feinmann. Also, she worked in the radio program Cada Mañana, hosted by Marcelo Longobardi with a panel integrated by Rolo Villar, Leandro Buonsante and Alberto Cormillot

María Isabel has written many romantic novels and self-help books, like Pasiones y tormentos: Cuando el amor lastima, Amores reales and El lado oscuro de los romances de la monarquía.

Awards
 2013 Martín Fierro Awards: Best female host.

References

Argentine radio presenters
Argentine women radio presenters
Living people
Year of birth missing (living people)